Maldivian English is an English dialect spoken in the Maldives, where it is predominantly used as a second language. The dialect has also been called Gasim English.

References

Dialects of English
Languages of the Maldives